WJAD (branded as Rock 103) is a radio station serving Albany, Georgia and surrounding cities with a rock format. This station broadcasts on FM frequency 103.5 MHz and is under ownership of Rick Lambert and Bob Spencer, through licensee First Media Services, LLC.  Its studios are on Broad Avenue just west of downtown Albany, and the transmitter is located northeast of Albany.

Programming includes, John Boy and Billy in the mornings, Nikki Miller in middays, Bill Dollar in afternoons and Flashback on Sundays.

On April 30, 2020, Cumulus Media sold its entire Albany cluster for First Media Services for $450,000. The sale was consummated on December 15, 2020.

References

External links
Rock 103 WJAD official website

JAD
Radio stations established in 1979
1979 establishments in Georgia (U.S. state)